The Orto Botanico dell'Università di Tor Vergata is a botanical garden at the University of Rome Tor Vergata, Rome, Italy. The first part of the collection was established in late 2007 with the biology department Center for Conservation of Germoplasm. Its mission is to preserve genetic biodiversity, and contains advanced equipment for cryopreservation of germoplasm and research in molecular genetics.

See also 
 List of botanical gardens in Italy

References 
 Province of Rome press release (Italian)
 Horti entry (Italian)

Botanical gardens in Italy
Gardens in Rome